Sophie Hediger (born 14 December 1998) is a Swiss snowboarder. She competed in the 2022 Winter Olympics, in women's snowboard cross, and in the mixed team snowboard cross.

She competed at the 2018–19 FIS Snowboard World Cup, 2019–20 FIS Snowboard World Cup, 2020–21 FIS Snowboard World Cup, and  2021–22 FIS Snowboard World Cup.

References 

1998 births
Swiss female snowboarders
Living people
Olympic snowboarders of Switzerland
Snowboarders at the 2022 Winter Olympics
Snowboarders at the 2016 Winter Youth Olympics
21st-century Swiss women
Youth Olympic silver medalists for Switzerland
Competitors at the 2023 Winter World University Games
Universiade gold medalists for Switzerland
Universiade medalists in snowboarding